Johan Julius Tallberg (born 13 May 1948, in Helsinki) is a sailor from Finland. Tallberg represented his country at the 1972 Summer Olympics in Kiel. Tallberg took 12th place in the Soling with Peter Tallberg as helmsman and Arndt Norrgård as fellow crew member.

References

Living people
1948 births
Sportspeople from Helsinki
Finnish male sailors (sport)
Sailors at the 1972 Summer Olympics – Soling
Olympic sailors of Finland